10 is the ninth studio album by American rapper LL Cool J. It was released by Def Jam Recordings on October 15, 2002 in the United States. LL Cool J and 10 hit a milestone in Def Jam history, being the first artist ever on Def Jam to have ten albums (out of his thirteen-album deal) under the same record label. The album peaked at number two on the US Billboard 200, while also reaching number 26 on the UK Albums Chart.

Critical reception

10 earned largely mixed reviews. At Metacritic, which assigns a normalized rating out of 100 to reviews from mainstream publications, the album received an average score of 60, based on eight reviews. Uncut called the project his "best album since 1987's Bigger and Deffer" and felt that 10 "sounds as fresh as his first." Dan Leory from Launch.com noted that the album "isn't a greatest hits collection – it just sounds like one. Reaching this career milestone, rare for any hip-hop artist, has brought on a rush of nostalgia that saturates each of these 15 songs."  

PopMatters editor Matt Cibula found that the album "suffers from the inevitable "L.L. album where he's not necessarily all that hungry and therefore a little too self-satisfied" syndrome, but only periodically. There are times on 10 where he’s in full effect boyeee with a side order of chips. It's a fun record, it's a frustrating record, it proves my thesis that L.L. is only dope when he's provoked and hungry."  AllMusic critic John Bush remarked: "Surprisingly, despite a strong roster of producers (Tone & Poke, the Neptunes, Ron "Amen-Ra" Lawrence), 10 isn't much of a head-turner [...] Just like on the cover, there's a lot of posturing going on here, but very little substance."

Chart performance
10 debuted and peaked at number two on the US Bilboard 200 in the week of November 2, 2002, selling 154,000 copies in its first week of release. This marked LL Cool J's highest first week sales yet. By September 2004, 10 had sold 968,000 copies in the United States. The album also reached number 26 on the UK Albums Chart, making it LL Cool J's highest charting album there to date.

Track listing
Credits adapted from the album's liner notes.

Samples
"Paradise" embodies portions of "Risin' to the Top", written by Kenneth Burke, Allan Felder, and Norma Jean Wright, performed by Keni Burke.
"Fa Ha" contains a sample from "Rich Girl", written by Daryl Hall, performed by Hall & Oates. 
"After School" contains elements of:
"It Takes Two", written by James Brown and Robert Ginyard, performed by Rob Base & DJ E-Z Rock.
"Rappers Delight", written by Bernard Edwards and Nile Rodgers, performed by The Sugarhill Gang.
"10 Million Stars" contains elements from "I Sing the Body Electric", written by Michael Gore and Dean Pitchford.
"Big Mama (Unconditional Love)" features samples of "Sadie", written by Bruce Howes, Joseph Jefferson, and Charles Simmons, performed by The Spinners.
"All I Have" contains a sample from "Very Special", written by Lisa Peters and William Jeffrey, performed by Debra Laws.

Charts

Weekly charts

Year-end charts

Certifications

References

2002 albums
Albums produced by the Neptunes
Albums produced by Trackmasters
Def Jam Recordings albums
LL Cool J albums